Canidae is a family of mammals in the order Carnivora, which includes domestic dogs, wolves, coyotes, foxes, jackals, dingoes, and many other extant and extinct dog-like mammals. A member of this family is called a canid; all extant species are a part of a single subfamily, Caninae, and are called canines. They are found on all continents except Antarctica, having arrived independently or accompanied human beings over extended periods of time. Canids vary in size, including tails, from the 2 meter (6 ft 7 in) wolf to the 46 cm (18 in) fennec fox. Population sizes range from the Falkland Islands wolf, extinct since 1876, to the domestic dog, which has a worldwide population of over 1 billion. The body forms of canids are similar, typically having long muzzles, upright ears, teeth adapted for cracking bones and slicing flesh, long legs, and bushy tails. Most species are social animals, living together in family units or small groups and behaving cooperatively. Typically, only the dominant pair in a group breeds, and a litter of young is reared annually in an underground den. Canids communicate by scent signals and vocalizations. One canid, the domestic dog, entered into a partnership with humans at least 14,000 years ago and today remains one of the most widely kept domestic animals.

The 13 extant genera and 37 species of Caninae are primarily split into two tribes: Canini, which includes 11 genera and 19 species, comprising the wolf-like Canina subtribe and the South American Cerdocyonina subtribe; and Vulpini, the fox-like canids, comprising 3 genera and 15 species. Not included in either tribe is the Urocyon genus, which includes 2 species, mainly comprising the gray fox and believed to be basal to the family. Additionally, one genus in Canini, Dusicyon, was composed of two recently extinct species, with the South American fox going extinct around 400 years ago and the Falkland Islands wolf going extinct in 1876.

In addition to the extant Caninae, Canidae comprises two extinct subfamilies designated as Hesperocyoninae and Borophaginae. Extinct species have also been placed into Caninae, in both extant and extinct genera; at least 80 extinct Caninae species have been found, as well as over 70 species in Borophaginae and nearly 30 in Hesperocyoninae, though due to ongoing research and discoveries the exact number and categorization is not fixed. The earliest canids found belong to Hesperocyoninae, and are believed to have diverged from the existing Caniformia suborder around 37 million years ago.

Conventions

Conservation status codes listed follow the International Union for Conservation of Nature (IUCN) Red List of Threatened Species. Range maps are provided wherever possible; if a range map is not available, a description of the canid's range is provided. Ranges are based on the IUCN Red List for that species, unless otherwise noted. All extinct species (or subspecies) listed alongside extant species went extinct after 1500 CE, and are indicated by a dagger symbol:  
"".

Classification
The family Canidae consists of 37 extant species belonging to 12 genera and divided into 194 extant subspecies, as well the extinct genus Dusicyon, comprising two extinct species, and 13 extinct wolf subspecies, which are the only canid species to go extinct since prehistoric times. This does not include hybrid species (such as wolfdogs or coywolfs) or extinct prehistoric species (such as the dire wolf or Epicyon). Modern molecular studies indicate that the 13 genera can be grouped into 3 tribes or clades.

Subfamily Caninae
Tribe Canini (true dogs)
Subtribe Canina (wolf-like canids)
Genus Canis: six species
Genus Cuon: one species
Genus Lupulella: two species
Genus Lycaon: one species
Subtribe Cerdocyonina (South American canids)
Genus Atelocynus: one species
Genus Cerdocyon: one species
Genus Chrysocyon: one species
Genus Dusicyon: two species
Genus Lycalopex: six species
Genus Speothos: one species
Tribe Vulpini (true foxes)
Genus Nyctereutes: two species
Genus Otocyon: one species
Genus Vulpes: twelve species
Genus Urocyon (gray foxes): two species

Canids
The following classification is based on the taxonomy described by Mammal Species of the World (2005), with augmentation by generally accepted proposals made since using molecular phylogenetic analysis, such as the promotion of the African golden wolf to a separate species from the golden jackal, and splitting out the Lupulella genus from Canis. Range maps are based on IUCN range data. There are several additional proposals which are disputed, such as the promotion of the red wolf and eastern wolf as species from subspecies of the wolf, which are marked with a "(debated)" tag.

Subfamily Caninae

Tribe Canini

Tribe Vulpini

Urocyon

Prehistoric canids
In addition to extant canids, a number of prehistoric species have been discovered and classified as a part of Canidae. Morphogenic and molecular phylogenic research has placed them within the extant subfamily Caninae as well as the extinct subfamilies Hesperocyoninae and Borophaginae. Within Caninae, prehistoric species have been placed into both extant genera and separate extinct genera.

The generally accepted classification of extinct canid species is primarily based for Hesperocyoninae on work by Xiaoming Wang, curator of terrestrial mammals at the Natural History Museum of Los Angeles County, and on work by Wang and zoologists Richard H. Tedford and Beryl E. Taylor for Borophaginae and Caninae. The species and classifications listed below are all from these works; exceptions due to more recently-described species are also listed with citations. Not all of these classifications are universally accepted, and alternate classifications for species are noted below. Where available, the approximate time period the species was extant is given in millions of years before the present (Mya), based on data from the Paleobiology Database. All listed species are extinct; where a genus, subtribe, or tribe within Caninae comprises only extinct species, it is indicated with a dagger symbol .

Subfamily Caninae

 Tribe Canini
 Subtribe Canina
 Genus Aenocyon (1.8–0.012 Mya)
 A. dirus (Dire wolf) (1.8–0.012 Mya)
 Genus Canis
 C. antonii
 C. apolloniensis (2.6–0.78 Mya)
 C. armbrusteri (Armbruster's wolf) (1.8–0.012 Mya)
 C. arnensis (Arno River dog) (2.6–0.78 Mya)
 C. brevicephalus
 C. cedazoensis (1.8–0.3 Mya)
 C. chihliensis
 C. cipio
 C. edwardii (23–0.78 Mya)
 C. etruscus (Etruscan wolf) (2.6–0.13 Mya)
 C. ferox  (4.9–2.6 Mya)
 C. gezi
 C. leilhardi
 C. lepophagus (4.9–0.012 Mya)
 C. longdanensis
 C. mosbachensis (Mosbach wolf) (2.6–0.13 Mya)
 C. nehringi
 C. othmani
 C. palmidens
 C. variabilis
 Genus Cynotherium (0.13–0.012 Mya)
 C. sardous (Sardinian dhole) (0.13–0.012 Mya)
 Genus Eucyon
 E. adoxus
 E. davisi (5.3–3.6 Mya)
 E. intrepidus
 E. monticinensis
 E. odessanus
 E. skinneri (13.6–10.3 Mya)
 E. zhoui
 Genus Lycaon
 L. magnus
 L. sekowei
 Genus Mececyon
 M. trinilensis
 Genus Megacyon (3.6–2.6 Mya)
 M. merriami (3.6–2.6 Mya)
 Genus Nurocyon
 N. chonokhariensis
 Genus Xenocyon
 X. africanus
 X. antonii
 X. falconeri
 X. lycaonoides (0.78–0.3 Mya)
 Subtribe Cerdocyonina
 Genus Cerdocyon
 C. ensenadensis
 C. texanus (4.9–1.8 Mya)
 Genus Nyctereutes
 N. abdeslami (3.6–2.6 Mya)
 N. donnezani
 N. megamastoides (2.6–0.13 Mya)
 N. sinensis
 N. terblanchei
 N. tingi
 Genus Protocyon
 P. orcesi (0.78–0.012 Mya)
 P. scagliarum
 P. troglodytes (0.13–0.012 Mya)
 Genus Speothos
 S. pacivorus (Pleistocene bush dog)
 Genus Theriodictis (1.8 Mya)
 T. floridanus (1.8 Mya)

 Tribe Vulpini
 Genus Ferrucyon
 F. avius (4.9–2.6 Mya)
 Genus Metalopex (10–4.9 Mya)
 M. bakeri (10–4.9 Mya)
 M. macconnelli (10–5.3 Mya)
 M. merriami (10–5.3 Mya)
 Genus Prototocyon
 P. curvipalatus
 P. recki
 Genus Vulpes
 V. alopecoides (2.5–0.13 Mya)
 V. angustidens
 V. beihaiensis
 V. chikushanensis
 V. galaticus
 V. praecorsac (3.2–0.78 Mya)
 V. praeglacialis
 V. riffautae
 V. skinneri
 V. stenognathus (14–0.3 Mya)
 V. qiuzhudingi
 Urocyon
 Genus Urocyon
 U. minicephalus (1.8–0.3 Mya)
 U. progressus (4.9–1.8 Mya)
 Basal Caninae
 Genus Leptocyon (31–10 Mya)
 L. delicatus (31–20 Mya)
 L. douglassi (31–26 Mya)
 L. gregorii (25–20 Mya)
 L. leidyi (20–14 Mya)
 L. matthewi (14–10 Mya)
 L. mollis (31–20 Mya)
 L. tejonensis (14–10 Mya)
 L. vafer (14–10 Mya)
 L. vulpinus (20–16 Mya)
 Unclassified
 Genus Protemnocyon (34–33 Mya)
 P. inflatus (34–33 Mya)

Subfamily Borophaginae

 Tribe Borophagini (26–1.8 Mya)
 Genus Cormocyon (26–20 Mya)
 C. copei (26–20 Mya)
 C. haydeni (25–20 Mya)
 Genus Desmocyon (20–16 Mya)
 D. matthewi (20–16 Mya)
 D. thomsoni (20–16 Mya)
 Genus Euoplocyon (20–14 Mya)
 E. brachygnathus (16–14 Mya)
 E. spissidens (20–16 Mya)
 Genus Metatomarctus (20–16 Mya)
 M. canavus (20–16 Mya)
 Genus Microtomarctus (16–14 Mya)
 M. conferta (16–14 Mya)
 Genus Protomarctus (16–14 Mya)
 P. optatus (16–14 Mya)
 Genus Psalidocyon (16–14 Mya)
 P. marianae (16–14 Mya)
 Genus Tephrocyon (16–14 Mya)
 T. rurestris (16–14 Mya)
 Subtribe Aelurodontina (16–5.3 Mya)
 Genus Aelurodon (16–5.3 Mya)
 A. asthenostylus (16–14 Mya)
 A. ferox (14–10 Mya)
 A. mcgrewi (16–14 Mya)
 A. montanensis (16–14 Mya)
 A. stirtoni (14–10 Mya)
 A. taxoides (10–5.3 Mya)
 Genus Tomarctus (16–14 Mya)
 T. brevirostris (16–14 Mya)
 T. hippophaga (16–14 Mya)
 Subtribe Borophagina (16–1.8 Mya)
 Genus Borophagus (14–1.8 Mya)
 B. diversidens (4.9–1.8 Mya)
 B. dudleyi (5.3–3.6 Mya)
 B. hilli (5.3–3.6 Mya)
 B. littoralis (14–10 Mya)
 B. orc (5.3–4.9 Mya)
 B. parvus (10–4.9 Mya)
 B. pugnator (10–5.3 Mya)
 B. secundus (10–4.9 Mya)
 Genus Carpocyon (16–5.3 Mya)
 C. compressus (16–14 Mya)
 C. limosus (10–5.3 Mya)
 C. robustus (14–10 Mya)
 C. webbi (14–5.3 Mya)
 Genus Epicyon (16–4.9 Mya)
 E. aelurodontoides (10–4.9 Mya)
 E. haydeni (10–4.9 Mya)
 E. saevus (16–4.9 Mya)
 Genus Paratomarctus (16–5.3 Mya)
 P. euthos (14–10 Mya)
 P. temerarius (16–5.3 Mya)
 Genus Protepicyon (16–14 Mya)
 P. raki (16–14 Mya)
 Subtribe Cynarctina (16–10 Mya)
 Genus Cynarctus (16–10 Mya)
 C. crucidens (12–10 Mya)
 C. galushai (16–14 Mya)
 C. marylandica (16–14 Mya)
 C. saxatilis (16–14 Mya)
 C. voorhiesi (14–10 Mya)
 C. wangi (16–14 Mya)
 Genus Paracynarctus (16–14 Mya)
 P. kelloggi (16–14 Mya)
 P. sinclairi (16–14 Mya)
 Tribe Phlaocyonini (30.8–13.6 Mya)
 Genus Cynarctoides (31–14 Mya)
 C. acridens (20–14 Mya)
 C. emryi (20–16 Mya)
 C. gawnae (20–16 Mya)
 C. harlowi (25–20 Mya)
 C. lemur (31–20 Mya)
 C. luskensis (25–20 Mya)
 C. roii (31–26 Mya)
 Genus Phlaocyon (31–16 Mya)
 P. achoros (25—20 Mya)
 P. annectens (25–20 Mya)
 P. latidens (31–20 Mya)
 P. leucosteus (20–16 Mya)
 P. mariae(20–16 Mya)
 P. marslandensis (20–16 Mya)
 P. minor (25–16 Mya)
 P. multicuspus (25–20 Mya)
 P. taylori (31–25 Mya)
 P. yatkolai (20–16 Mya)
 Basal Borophaginae
 Genus Archaeocyon (31–20 Mya)
 A. falkenbachi (31–20 Mya)
 A. leptodus (31–26 Mya)
 A. pavidus (31–26 Mya)
 Genus Otarocyon (34–26 Mya)
 O. cooki (31–26 Mya)
 O. macdonaldi (34–33 Mya)
 Genus Oxetocyon (33–31 Mya)
 O. cuspidatus (33–31 Mya)
 Genus Rhizocyon (31–20 Mya)
 R. oregonensis (31–20 Mya)

Subfamily Hesperocyoninae

 Genus Cynodesmus (31–20 Mya)
 C. martini (31–20 Mya)
 C. thooides (31–26 Mya)
 Genus Caedocyon (31–20 Mya)
 C. tedfordi (31–20 Mya)
 Genus Ectopocynus (31–16 Mya)
 E. antiquus (31–20 Mya)
 E. intermedius (31–20 Mya)
 E. siplicidens (20–16 Mya)
 Genus Enhydrocyon (31–20 Mya)
 E. basilatus (25–20 Mya)
 E. crassidens (26–20 Mya)
 E. pahinsintewkpa (26–20 Mya)
 E. stenocephalus (31–20 Mya)
 Genus Hesperocyon (37–31 Mya)
 H. coloradensis (34–33 Mya)
 H. gregarius (37–31 Mya)
 Genus Mesocyon (33–20 Mya)
 M. brachyops (31–20 Mya)
 M. coryphaeus (31–20 Mya)
 M. temnodon (33–20 Mya)
 Genus Osbornodon (33–14 Mya)
 O. brachypus (20–16 Mya)
 O. fricki (16–14 Mya)
 O. iamonensis (20–16 Mya)
 O. renjiei (33–31 Mya)
 O. scitulus (21–16 Mya)
 O. sesnoni (31–20 Mya)
 O. wangi (31–20 Mya)
 Genus Paraenhydrocyon (25–20 Mya)
 P. josephi (25–20 Mya)
 P. robustus (25–20 Mya)
 P. wallovianus (25–20 Mya)
 Genus Philotrox (31–26 Mya)
 P. condoni (31–26 Mya)
 Genus Prohesperocyon (37–34 Mya)
 P. wilsoni (37–34 Mya)
 Genus Sunkahetanka (31–26 Mya)
 S. geringensis (31–26 Mya)

Notes

References

 
canids
canids